were French irregular military formations during the Franco-Prussian War of 1870.

Franc-Tireur may also refer to:
 Franc-Tireur (movement), a French Resistance movement founded in Lyon in 1940 as 
 Franc-Tireur (newspaper), the official publication of the  movement
 , a Quebec television show hosted by Richard Martineau

See also 
 Francs-Tireurs et Partisans (FTP, or FTPF), armed French Resistance group created in 1939
 Francs-Tireurs et Partisans de la Main d'Oeuvre Immigrée (FTP-MOI), a resistance group

Military units and formations disambiguation pages